Nava Nalanda High School is a co-educational institution in South Kolkata, India, affiliated to the West Bengal Board of Secondary Education for Madhyamik Pariksha (10th Board exams), and to the West Bengal Council of Higher Secondary Education for Uchcho Madhyamik Pariksha (12th Board exams).It was founded on 1st February 1967 by Bharati Mitra & Arya Mitra.

Sport
Nava Nalanda High School has won the CAB Mayor's Cup Cricket (U-15) in 2018 as well as 2019.
The School scored 844 runs in 45 overs against Gyan Bharati Vidyalaya, on 22 February 2016, to set a record score for a Cricket Association of Bengal school cricket tournament. They won the match by a record 812 runs.

Notable alumni
 Lagnajita Chakraborty, singer
 Aneek Dhar, singer
 Poulomi Ghatak, table tennis player
 Mimi Mondal, writer
 Raja Venkat, cricketer
Abhishek Banerjee , Politician

References

External links 
 

Primary schools in West Bengal
High schools and secondary schools in Kolkata
Educational institutions established in 1967
1967 establishments in West Bengal